This is an incomplete list of the 2019 Women's March events, most of which took place on January 19, 2019, some on January 20 or later (as noted), and a few before (also as noted).


United States

Listed below are the marches in the U.S. in support of, or independent of, the 2019 Women's March.

Worldwide

Listed below are marches outside the United States in support of the 2019 Women's March.

Notes

References

External links 

2019 in American politics
2019 in Asia
2019 in Europe
2019 in North America
2019 in Oceania
2019 in Africa
2019 protests
2019-related lists
Feminism-related lists
Foreign relations of the United States
History of women's rights
Human rights-related lists
January 2019 events
Lists of places
Protests against Donald Trump
Protest marches
Reactions to the election of Donald Trump
2019 in women's history
Women's marches
Gatherings of women
List of 2019 Women's March locations